Chelif River (also spelled Chéliff, or Sheliff) is a  river in Algeria, the longest in the country.  It rises in the Saharan Atlas near the city of Aflou, flows through the Tell Atlas and empties into the Mediterranean Sea north of the city of Mostaganem.  The water level in the river often fluctuates.  The river is being used for irrigation (mainly on its lower course).

The river was formerly called the Mekerra and the Sig River.

Notes

References 

Rivers of Algeria